is a Japanese manga series written by Mikiyasu Kamada and illustrated by Ashibi Fukui. It was serialized in Shueisha's Weekly Shōnen Jump magazine from February to July 2021, with its chapters collected into three tankōbon volumes.

Publication
The series is written by Mikiyasu Kamada and illustrated by Ashibi Fukui. It was serialized in Shueisha's Weekly Shōnen Jump magazine from February 15 to July 4, 2021. Shueisha collected its chapters into three tankōbon volumes, released from June 4 to October 4, 2021.

Viz Media and Manga Plus published chapters of the series simultaneously with the Japanese release. Viz Media will digitally release the series volumes in September 2022.

Volume list

References

Further reading

External links
  
 
 
 

Baseball in anime and manga
School life in anime and manga
Shōnen manga
Shueisha manga
Viz Media manga